Edvardas Jokūbas Daukša (May 1836  1890) was a Lithuanian poet, translator, participant of 1863 Uprising.

Biography
Edvardas Daukša  was born in Biržai and studied in the local gymnasium, later in Slutsk. He enrolled in the University of Moscow, and later moved to the University of Tartu. Until 1860 he studied philology at the University of Königsberg. From 1861 he lived in Vilnius, and participated in 1863 Uprising. For participating in the uprising he was sentenced to sixteen years of penal labour.

Edvardas Jokūbas Daukša translated numerous works of Johann Wolfgang von Goethe, George Gordon Byron and others. He wrote a grammar of the Lithuanian language Trumpa kalbmokslė liežuvio lietuviško (around 1856).

References

1836 births
1890 deaths
People from Biržai
Lithuanian male poets
Lithuanian translators
19th-century translators
19th-century poets
Translators of Johann Wolfgang von Goethe